Kochi Duronto may refer to:

 Ernakulam-H.Nizamudin Duronto
 Ernakulam-Lokmanya Tilak Duronto